Dejan Vasiljevic (born 26 April 1997) is an Australian professional basketball player for the Sydney Kings of the National Basketball League (NBL). He played college basketball at the University of Miami.

Early life
Vasiljevic was born in Calgary, Alberta, the son of Serbian handball player Todor Vasiljević. He moved with his family to Melbourne at the age of six. Growing up, Vasiljevic played soccer, tennis, and cricket, and did not begin playing basketball until the age of 12. His father attempted to mold him after Croatian basketball player Drazen Petrovic and enrolled his son at the Australian Institute of Sport. Vasiljevic was recruited by Stanford, LSU, Louisville, and California, but he signed with Miami because he liked the academics and his family loved the city.

College career
Vasiljevic set the Miami freshman record for made three-pointers (51) while averaging 6.0 points and 1.3 rebounds per game. He posted 9.0 points and 2.5 rebounds per game as a sophomore, while shooting 41.1 percent from three-point range. At the end of his sophomore season, Vasiljevic suffered a stress fracture in his foot. Instead of surgery, he went on a nutrition plan crafted by his girlfriend, and lost some weight. As a junior, Vasiljevic averaged 11.8 points and 4.5 rebounds per game on a team that finished 14–18. Following his junior season, Vasiljevic considered turning professional, but was persuaded to return by coach Jim Larrañaga. On 21 November 2019, he scored a career-high 25 points including the two clinching foul shots with 1.2 seconds remaining in a 74–70 win over Missouri State. As a senior, Vasiljevic averaged 13.2 points and 4.2 rebounds per game. He scored 1,271 points in his college career, ranking 21st on the Hurricane's all-time list, and is second in made three-pointers with 272.

Professional career

Sydney Kings (2020–present)
On 17 July 2020, Vasiljevic signed a three-year deal with the Sydney Kings of the National Basketball League (NBL).

In July 2022, Vasiljevic joined the Phoenix Suns for the NBA Summer League.

On 4 January 2023, Vasiljevic scored a career-high 42 points with ten 3-pointers in a 118–102 win over the South East Melbourne Phoenix.

National team career
Vasiljevic has represented Australia at several international tournaments. In the 2013 FIBA Oceania U16 Tournament, he averaged 20 points per game. He won a silver medal at the 2014 FIBA Under-17 World Championship in Dubai and was named to the all-tournament team after averaging 17.4 points and 6.6 rebounds per game. At the 2015 FIBA Under-19 World Championship in Heraklion, Vasiljevic averaged 13.3 points and 3.1 rebounds per game.
In 2019, he helped his team win bronze at the Summer Universiade in Italy, scoring 33 points in the consolation win against Israel.

References

External links
NBL profile
Miami Hurricanes bio
Twitter

1997 births
Living people
Australian men's basketball players
Australian expatriate basketball people in the United States
Australian people of Serbian descent
Basketball people from Alberta
Basketball players from Melbourne
Medalists at the 2019 Summer Universiade
Miami Hurricanes men's basketball players
Shooting guards
Sportspeople from Calgary
Sydney Kings players
Universiade bronze medalists for Australia
Universiade medalists in basketball